A Vertical Race is a special kind of ski mountaineering without the typical downhill skiing after ascending. At the mountain running and climbing passages the runners have to carry their skis in their backpacks. Vertical Races for women and men are part of all international ski mountaineering competitions of the International Council for Ski Mountaineering Competitions (ISMC) as well as at many national competitions.  The Union Internationale des Associations d'Alpinisme (UIAA)is working toward the goal of having Vertical Race become an Olympic discipline at the 2018 Winter Olympics, .

Championships 
At World Championships of Skimountaineering a Vertical Race was firstly rated in 2004 an at the European Championships in 2005.

References 

Ski mountaineering